This is a list of least carbon efficient power stations in selected countries. Lists were created by the WWF and lists the most polluting power stations in terms of the level of carbon dioxide produced per unit of electricity generated.  In general lignite burning coal-fired power stations with subcritical boilers (in which bubbles form in contrast to the newer supercritical steam generator) emit the most. The Chinese national carbon trading scheme may follow the European Union Emission Trading Scheme in making such power stations uneconomic to run. However some companies such as NLC India Limited and Electricity Generation Company (Turkey) generate in countries without a carbon price. Lignite power stations built or retrofitted before 1995 often also emit local air pollution. In early 2021 the EU carbon price rose above 50 euros per tonne, causing many of the European plants listed below to become unprofitable, and close down. However, because many countries outside Europe and the USA do not publish plant level emissions data it was difficult to make up to date lists. Public information from space-based measurements of carbon dioxide by Climate Trace is expected to quantify  from individual large plants before the 2021 United Nations Climate Change Conference, thus enabling large polluters to be identified.

2015 report - companies 
In 2015 the Stranded Assets Programme at the University of Oxford’s Smith School of Enterprise and the Environment published Stranded Assets and Subcritical Coal report analyzing inter alia carbon intensity of subcritical coal-fired power stations of 100 largest companies having these power stations.

2005 report - power station from 30 industrialised countries

2007 list - Europe

2018 - largest emitters 
The table lists the largest emitters, regardless of their carbon efficiency.

Other 
At over 1.34 tCO2-e/MWh Yallourn is the most carbon intense in Australia.

In the very unlikely event of being built, the proposed Afşin-Elbistan C power station would become the least carbon efficient coal-fired power station.

External links 
 Europe Beyond Coal

Sources

References 

Lists of power stations
Power stations
Pollution
Economy-related lists of superlatives
Lists of coal-fired power stations